Ophiusa rufescens  is a moth of the family Erebidae. It is found in Africa, including Sierra Leone.

References

Ophiusa
Moths of Africa
Moths described in 1913